Michel Georges-Michel (3 November 1883 – 31 March 1985), was a French painter, journalist, novelist, and translator of English and American authors. He was born in Paris.

Biography
Georges-Michel studied at Beaux Arts, a student of Othon Friesz and Dufy, and at l'École du Louvre. An artistic councillor, he worked with the Ballets Russes of Sergei Diaghilev from 1913 to 1929. In 1917 he organised the first exhibition of Picasso in Rome. Founder of the prix de Rome for poetry, he worked on exhibitions of Matisse and Soutine at the Venice Biennale. He was also the initiator of the first cinema festivals and was president of the Association of dance writers and critics as well as the vice-president of the French Artistic Press Union.

He should not be confused with his near-namesake, the painter Georges Michel (1763–1843), known as Michel de Montparnasse.

Works

Georges-Michel wrote more than one hundred books, diaries, critiques, souvenirs and novels. Some of his works have been adapted for cinema and television. Many of his works are displayed in museums, notably in the Museum of Modern Art in Paris and the Museum of San Francisco.

One of his most famous works, Les Montparnos, known as the first Georges-Michel,  was written in 1923, published in 1929 and reprinted for the mass market (by Le Livre de Poche in 1976). Set in Montparnasse, it was based on the life of Modigliani (Modrulleau in the novel) and his mistress Jeanne Hébuterne (whose nickname "Noix-de-Coco" inspired the character of "Haricot-Rouge" in the novel)

Other works by Georges-Michel
La Rose de Perse, French illustrated edition, 1920
L'Époque tango, Tome I, Pall-malls, Deauville, Paris, Riviéra, L'édition, 1920
La Vie à Deauville, cover by van Dongen, Flammarion, 1922
Dans la fête à Venice, cover by Van Dongen, Fayard, 1922
La Bohême canaille, Re-edition, 1922
Les Montparnos, novel, cover by Picasso, Fayard, 1924; Le Livre de Poche, 1976 [film, Les amants de Montparnasse, 1958, directed by Jacques Becker, starring Gérard Philippe as Modigliani, Anouk Aimée as Jeanne Hébuterne, Lino Ventura...]
La Vie mondaine sur la Riviéra et en Italie, Nice, Cannes, Monte Carlo, Rome, Florence, Venise, cover by Van Dongen, Flammarion, 1925
En jardinant avec Bergson, chroniques 1899-1926, Albin Michel, 1926
Deauville, 1928; Le livre d'histoire-Lorisse, 2002
Les Journées de Biarritz, éditions Baudinière, 1931
Folles de luxe et dames de qualité, cover by Van Dongen, éditions Baudinière, 1931
Nuits d'actrices, Les éditions de France, 1933
Peau douce, novel, éditions Baudinière, 1933
La Bohème de minuit, Fayard, 1933
Ardente, novel, Tallandier, 1934
Coeur-chaud ou le chercheur d'amour, éditions Baudinière, 1934
Mon image devant toi, cover by Van Dongen, éditions Baudinière, 1935
Autres Montparnos, Albin Michel, 1935
Star, novel, éditions Baudinière, 1939
Nulle part dans le monde,  tome 1. Le dernier bateau, tome 2. Il est grand d'être à Miami, La Maison française, 1941
Peintres et sculpteurs que j'ai connus, 1900-1942, Brentano's, 1942
Chefs d'œuvres de peintres contemporains, Maison française, 1945
Le Baiser à Consuelo, suivi de Récits d'Espagne, Bordas, 1947
De Renoir à Picasso, Les peintres que j'ai connus, Fayard, 1954

See also

School of Paris

References

Michel Georges-Michel, Les Montparnos, Le Livre de Poche, Paris, 1976 (presentation).

External links
 

20th-century French non-fiction writers
French art critics
1883 births
1985 deaths
Writers from Paris
Pseudonymous artists
20th-century French male writers
French male non-fiction writers
French centenarians
Men centenarians